Leonard White (May 3, 1767October 10, 1849) was a United States representative from Massachusetts. He graduated from Harvard University in 1787. On August 21, 1794, White married Mary Dalton of Newbury and he later became a member of the state House of Representatives (1809–11). He was elected as a Federalist to the Twelfth United States Congress (March 4, 1811 – March 3, 1813). He served as town clerk of Haverhill and cashier of the Merrimack Bank of Haverhill (1814-1836), and held many other local offices. He is interred in Pentucket Cemetery.

References

External links
 

Members of the Massachusetts House of Representatives
Harvard University alumni
1767 births
1849 deaths
Federalist Party members of the United States House of Representatives from Massachusetts